Qarah Khezer (also Romanized as Qarah Kheẕer and Qareh Kheẕr; also known as Qarah Qhezer) is a village in Lahijan-e Sharqi Rural District, Lajan District, Piranshahr County, West Azerbaijan Province, Iran. At the 2006 census, its population was 267, in 46 families.

References 

Populated places in Piranshahr County